Hermógenes Valente Fonseca (born 4 November 1908, date of death unknown) is a former Brazilian football player. He played for the Brazil national team at the 1930 FIFA World Cup finals.

Honours

Club
 Campeonato Carioca (2): 
América: 1928, 1931

References

1908 births
Year of death missing
Footballers from Rio de Janeiro (city)
Brazilian footballers
Brazil international footballers
1930 FIFA World Cup players
Association football midfielders